Deverell is a surname. Notable people with the surname include:

Christopher Deverell MBE, a British Army officer and Director General Logistics Support and Equipment at HQ Land Forces
Colville Deverell GBE, KCMG (1907–1995), Irish cricketer and colonial administrator
Cyril Deverell GCB, KBE, ADC (1874–1947), British career military officer, Chief of the Imperial General Staff in 1936 and 1937
Jack Deverell KCB OBE (born 1945), Commander-in-Chief Allied Forces Northern Europe
John Deverell (1880–1965), British actor
Richard Deverell (born 1965), director of the Royal Botanic Gardens, Kew
Rita Deverell CM (born 1945), Canadian television broadcaster and social activist
Walter Deverell (1827–1854), English artist, born in the US, associated with the Pre-Raphaelite Brotherhood
William Deverell (born 1937), Canadian novelist, activist, and criminal lawyer